The dusky twinspot (Euschistospiza cinereovinacea) is a species of estrildid finch found in Sub-Saharan Africa. It has an estimated global extent of occurrence of 130,000 km2.

It is found in Angola and the Albertine Rift montane forests. The status of the species is evaluated as Least Concern.

References

BirdLife Species Factsheet

External link
 
 

dusky twinspot
Birds of Central Africa
dusky twinspot